Men of Vizion  is an American R&B quintet that came to fame in 1996, with the debut album, Personal, which featured the songs, "House Keeper" and "Do Thangz", produced by Teddy Riley and "Lil" Chris Smith.

Career
The members of Men Of Vizion met at the LaGuardia High School of Music and Art. Randolph was training to be a classical pianist and sang frequently around the city in a jazz ensemble. After writing the five part harmony selection for the group which got the attention of Michael Jackson and mega producer Teddy Riley entitled "Kingdom On Top of The World", Randolph moved to Dallas, Texas in 1989. Now a quartet started doing backup vocals and also danced with Queen Latifah along with high school classmate and actor Omar Epps. They were originally called Vizion. They then added eventual lead singer and Brooklyn native Prathan "Spanky" Williams. During the early years, the band played at parties, entered talent shows and performed at local nightclubs. Their persistence paid off when they were signed to Jade Productions. With the support of new jack swing vocalist Teddy Riley, the group was eventually signed with MJJ Music. As the group matured they changed their name to Men Of Vizion. Replacement members Anthony Fuller, Dwayne Jones, and Michael Best appeared in the 1989 biographical-drama film, Lean on Me starring Morgan Freeman. as members of the R&B group Riff.

Their debut album, Personal, was released in 1996.  Men of Vizion covered the 1977 hit single by The Jacksons, "Show You the Way to Go." Deramus, Greggs and Randolph left the group after the first album's release and Deramus and Greggs eventually formed a duo called The Kraft which Randolph joined soon after. They were replaced by three members of the R&B Group Riff from Paterson, New Jersey; Anthony "Chill" Fuller, his brother Dwayne "Stylz" Jones, and Michael "Nitty Green" Best, and the group released their second album MOV in 1999.

Discography

Albums
Personal (1996) MJJ Music/Sony
MOV (1999) MJJ Music/Sony

Singles

 "House Keeper" (US #67, R&B #13)
 "Do You Feel Me? (...Freak You)" (R&B #45)
 "Break Me Off"

Videography
 Lean on Me (1989)

References

External links
Men of Vizion on Myspace

American contemporary R&B musical groups
550 Music artists